The Nigeria national basketball team represents Nigeria in men's international basketball and it is overseen by the Nigeria Basketball Federation (NBBF).

In March 2021, the global governing body FIBA ranked Nigeria as Africa's top men's basketball nation. After the 2016 Olympic Men's Basketball Tournament in Rio, Nigeria was ranked 16th in the FIBA World Rankings, making them the top climber in FIBA rankings from 2015.

Nigeria is the only African nation to beat the United States. Nigeria is also the first African team to qualify for the Summer Olympics through the FIBA World Olympic Qualifying Tournament. This was accomplished at the 2012 Event when Nigeria beat the world elite teams of Lithuania and Greece. In 2015, Nigeria won its first crown as basketball champion of Africa.

History
The history of basketball in Nigeria goes as far back as the late 1950s when Walid Zabadne served as the first basketball coach to train Nigerians. At the time, Nigeria's only basketball court was situated in the Syrian Club in Lagos. Walid Zabadne continued teaching young Nigerians to become basketballers and when Nigeria's basketball federation was organized, he took them to several basketball competitions across Africa. In view of his role as the pioneer of basketball in Nigeria, Walid Zabadne has been deemed "father of Nigerian basketball’’. Also worthy of note is that Zabadne was later made the president of the Nigerian Basketball Federation.

Nigeria's national basketball team joined FIBA in 1964. Since the mid-1990s, the team has enjoyed unprecedented success, due to an increasing amount of talents from Nigeria as well as an orchestrated recruitment of American college and professional players of Nigerian descent. The D'Tigers (as the team is nicknamed) qualified for the 2006 FIBA World Championship, marking only the second time in the country's history that they qualified to the FIBA World Cup. Team Nigeria usually plays its home games at the 3,000-capacity Indoor Sports Hall in Lagos.

2006 FIBA World Championship
Nigeria took part in the 2006 FIBA World Championship in Japan. They were drawn in Group A with Argentina, France, Lebanon, Serbia and Montenegro, and Venezuela. They surprisingly finished third in Group A, then were narrowly defeated by Germany in the Round of 16. Overall they finished 14th, as they achieved the same record as the defending world champion Serbia and Montenegro.

2012 Summer Olympics
Nigeria competed at the 2012 Summer Olympics. They finished the group play with a 1–4 record, with their lone victory coming against Tunisia in their Olympics debut. The team's roster, assembled by coach Ayodele Bakare, primarily comprised former college basketball players.

2016 Summer Olympics
Nigeria qualified for the 2016 Summer Olympics tournament as champions of AfroBasket 2015. They finished at the bottom of Group B, winning one game against Croatia and losing four games. The team entered the 2016 games with several injured players and little financial support from the Nigerian government.

2020 Summer Olympics
As the top African team at the 2019 FIBA Basketball World Cup, Nigeria qualified for their third consecutive Olympics berth for the 2020 Summer Olympics. The team, which included seven NBA players and was led by Golden State Warriors assistant coach Mike Brown, was called up for training in the United States in June 2021. D'Tigers defeated the United States 90–87 during an exhibition game in Las Vegas on 10 July. The victory, described as an "upset", was the first for an African team against the United States.

Team honours and achievements
Intercontinental
FIBA Stanković Continental Champions' Cup
Bronze:  2013,  2016
Basketball at the Commonwealth Games
Fourth-place: 2006
Continental
AfroBasket
Gold Medal:  2015
Silver Medal:  1997,  1999,  2003,  2017
Bronze Medal:  1995,  2005,  2011
All Africa Games
Gold Medal:  2011
Bronze Medal:  1995,  1999,  2003,  2007,  2015

Performance table

Olympic Games

FIBA World Cup

FIBA Africa Championship

African Games

1973 – ?
1987 – ?
1995 – 
1999 – 
2003 – 
2007 – 
2011 – 
2015 –

FIBA Stanković Continental Champions' Cup

2013 – 
2016 –

Commonwealth Games

Team

Current roster
Roster for the Afrobasket 2021.

Depth chart

Notable players
Several players of the Nigeria national team have had success playing for professional teams, in the NBA, or in Europe, including:
Julius Nwosu
Akin Akingbala
Peter Aluma
Aloysius Anagonye
Tunji Awajobi
Ike Diogu
Obinna Ekezie
Ebi Ere
Benjamin Eze
Ekene Ibekwe
 Ike Iroegbu (born 1995)
Gani Lawal
Michael Olowokandi
Olumide Oyedeji
Ime Udoka
Jeff Varem
Al-Farouq Aminu
Festus Ezeli

Hakeem Olajuwon never played for Nigeria at the international senior level, and would eventually play for the United States, after becoming a US citizen in 1993.

Past rosters
2009 African Championship: finished 5th among 16 teams

Akin Akingbala, Aloysius Anagonye, Chamberlain Oguchi, Deji Akindele, Michael Efevberha, Michael Umeh, Josh Akognon, Ebi Ere, Ejike Ugboaja, Gabe Muoneke, Jayson Obazuaye, Benson Egemonye (Coach: John Lucas II)

2011 African Championship: finished 3rd among 16 teams

Solomon Tat, Ime Udoka, Abubakar Usman, Chinedu Onyeuku, Ike Ofoegbu, Michael Umeh, Stanley Gumut, Derrick Obasohan, Ejike Ugboaja, Ezenwa Ukeagu, Jayson Obazuaye, Olumide Oyedeji (Coach: Ayo Bakare)

2012 Summer Olympics: finished 10th among 12 teams

Tony Skinn, Ekene Ibekwe, Ike Diogu, Al-Farouq Aminu, Ade Dagunduro, Chamberlain Oguchi, Koko Archibong, Richard Oruche, Ejike Ugboaja, Derrick Obasohan, Alade Aminu, Olumide Oyedeji (Coach: Ayo Bakare)

2020 Olympic roster:
A 15-player roster was announced on 6 July 2021. The final squad was released on 20 July 2021.

Head coaches
 Vladislav Lučić 1975–1980
 Sam Vincent 2004–2006
 Sani Ahmed 2006
 Robert McCullum 2007
 John Lucas II 2009
 Sani Ahmed 2010, 2013
 Ayo Bakare 2011–2014
 William Voigt 2015–2017
 Alexander Nwora 2017–present Associate Headcoach from 2020–present.
 Mike Brown 2020–2022
 Alan Major July 2022–present

Kit

Manufacturer
2019–present: Peak

See also
Nigeria national under-19 basketball team
Nigeria national under-17 basketball team
Nigeria national 3x3 team
Nigeria women's national basketball team

References

External links

FIBA Profile
Nigeria Basketball Records at FIBA Archive
Afrobasket – Nigeria Men National Team

Videos
Nigeria – Team Highlights – AfroBasket 2015 Youtube.com video

National team
Men's national basketball teams
Basketball
1964 establishments in Nigeria